Vladimir (Vladislav) Ivanovich Istomin (– ) was a Russian rear admiral (1853) and hero of the Siege of Sevastopol.

Biography
In 1827, Vladimir Istomin graduated from the Naval College. That same year, he then took part in the Battle of Navarino and later in the blockade of the Dardanelles (1828-1829). In 1836, Istomin was transferred from the Baltic Fleet to the Black Sea Fleet. In 1850, he was appointed commander of the ship of the line Parizh (Париж), which would participate in the Battle of Sinop in 1853. 

During the Siege of Sevastopol, Vladimir Istomin was in charge of the defense of the Malakhov Mound (Малахов курган) and nearby redoubts, setting an example of bravery and tenacity. He was killed by a cannonball on the Kamchatka redoubt on March 7, 1855. Istomin was buried in the Admirals' Burial Vault in Sevastopol.

1810 births
1855 deaths
People from Penza Oblast
People from Mokshansky Uyezd
Imperial Russian Navy admirals
Recipients of the Cross of St. George
Recipients of the Order of St. George of the Third Degree
Russian military personnel killed in the Crimean War